The Talbot Gardens is a hockey arena in the Canadian community of Simcoe, Ontario. Opened in 1946, Talbot Gardens played a role in filling a need for ice hockey in North America in addition to other sports that could be played indoors during the summer months. A professional hockey team, the Norfolk IceCats, once played out of Talbot Gardens before the North Eastern Hockey League became defunct. It was also once home to the Norfolk Vikings of the Greater Metro Junior A Hockey League.

A Junior "C" team, the Simcoe Shamrocks of the Niagara & District Junior C Hockey League played at this arena until 2018.

Summary
Certain hockey games pertaining to the former Simcoe Shamrocks were broadcast on Community Cable Channel 5 during the weekends. During the 1990s, the arena was given a facelift to look more like Maple Leaf Gardens (the former home of the Toronto Maple Leafs). Thus, the architecture was re-arranged and the arena received a new coat of paint. Local sponsors (most notably Tim Hortons) have always decorated the scoreboard in addition to the interior of the hockey arena. Roller hockey is a featured attraction in the summer and is played by children as a practice game for the winter ice hockey games. Hockey season at Talbot Gardens typically lasts from September 1 (just before Canadian Labour Day) to April 15.

Part of the arena is also a preschool, which replaced the Campbell Clark Preschool.

On September 12, 2012, Talbot Gardens was the venue for the construction dispute involving the renovation of Ontario provincial Highway 3 from Simcoe to neighboring Delhi. A mixed gender charity hockey game is a Family Day tradition at Talbot Gardens; allowing spouses to play alongside each other in a non-competitive environment.

References

External links
 Arena Maps - Talbot Gardens
 Rink Time
 Norfolk Community Services

1946 establishments in Ontario
Buildings and structures in Norfolk County, Ontario
Indoor arenas in Ontario
Indoor ice hockey venues in Canada